Marcos da Silva leads here. For other people named Marcos da Silva, see Marcos da Silva (disambiguation)
Mark of Lisbon (died 1622), properly Marcos da Silva, was a Portuguese Franciscan, historian, and the Bishop of Porto.

While visiting the main convents of the Franciscan Order in Spain, Italy, and France, Mark collected a number of original documents about the order's history at the instance of the minister general, Fr. André Álvarez. Earlier, in 1532, the minister general, Father Paul Pisotti, had instructed all the provincials of the order to collect all documents they could find pertaining to the fifteenth century, to continue the Conformities of Bartholomew of Pisa. When these documents were gathered together, it was given to Mark, who compiled them together with information he himself had gathered, as well as that from the Chronicle of Marianus of Florence, into his Portuguese language work Chronicle of the Friars Minor. This was published in Lisbon from 1557 to 1568.

The work is made up almost entirely of biographies of illustrious men of the order, which makes the title somewhat misleading. It is of great historical value, especially since the original sources to which the author had access, have entirely disappeared.

Mark of Lisbon is confused with Franciscan friar and lexicographer Marcos de Lisboa who actually authored the first major vocabulary in the Bikol language in the Philippines, the Vocabulario de la lengua Bicol and which according to Malcolm Mintz was rendered in manuscript form around 1610  However, though it was compiled from 1602 to 1611, the dictionary would only be posthumously published in 1754, and Arte de la lengua Bicol (1647) from Andres de San Agustin preceded it in print.

References

Year of birth missing
1622 deaths
16th-century Portuguese historians
17th-century Portuguese historians
Bishops of Porto
Portuguese Franciscans
Portuguese Roman Catholics